Bryan Garrett Smith is an American chess grandmaster.

Chess career
Smith grew up in Anchorage, Alaska. He earned the International Master title in January 2007.

In May 2011, he earned a Grandmaster norm in the LIMPEDEA Cup in Romania by winning the tournament.

In March 2013, he tied for first place with GM Mikheil Kekelidze in the open section of the 35th Annual Marchand held in Rochester, New York. He was awarded the Grandmaster title later in 2013.

In November 2017, he won the 48th National Chess Congress held in Philadelphia. The event had 7 other Grandmasters, and Smith was rated over 200 points lower than the top seeded players. During the tournament, Smith defeated Alexander Shabalov in an upset and drew against Alexey Dreev.

References

Living people
1980 births
American chess players
Chess grandmasters
Sportspeople from Anchorage, Alaska